The 1984 Nabisco Wightman Cup was the 56th edition of the annual women's team tennis competition between the United States and Great Britain. It was held at the Royal Albert Hall in London in England in the United Kingdom.

References

1984
1984 in tennis
1984 sports events in London
1984 in British women's sport
1984 in women's tennis
1984 in American tennis
1984 in English tennis